Srinagar Baramulla highway is the national highway and the road in Kashmir valley that connects municipal committee of Srinagar with Baramulla. Border Roads Organization is in the process of constructing new concrete bridges at places where old army's iron bridges were constructed for the proper development of the road. The highway is the part of National Highway 44 which is originally road between Uri and Leh. Jammu and Kashmir state road transport corporation provides transport facilities on the road every day on fixed time intervals for the convenience of the people traveling from Srinagar to Baramulla or vice versa.

See also
 Srinagar Jammu National Highway

References

Roads in Jammu and Kashmir
Kashmir